Fredrik Jönsson (born 6 October 1972) is a Swedish equestrian. He competed in the individual eventing at the 1996 Summer Olympics.

References

External links
 

1972 births
Living people
Swedish male equestrians
Olympic equestrians of Sweden
Equestrians at the 1996 Summer Olympics
Sportspeople from Stockholm
20th-century Swedish people
21st-century Swedish people